The 2015 Zürich cantonal elections were held on 12 April 2015, to elect the seven members of the cantonal Executive Council and the 180 members of the Cantonal Council.

This election resulted in a large gain for the bourgeois parties (SVP, FDP, CVP), as the FDP gained eight seats in the Cantonal Council and the CVP gained one executive councilor, resulting in the alliance holding an overall majority in the national council and five of the seven executive councilors.

Electoral system

Executive Council 
The Executive Council contains 7 members elected using a two-round majoritarian system. In the first round, electors have up to seven votes and the 7 most-voted candidates reaching an overall majority (>50%) are elected. If seats remain to be filled, a runoff is held where electors have as many votes as seats remaining, and the candidates with the most votes (simple plurality) are elected.

Cantonal Council 
The Cantonal Council is elected using open-list proportional representation, with canton-wide apportionment of seats and allocation into 18 constituencies (biproportional apportionment). In each constituency, voters have as many votes as there are seats to fill (panachage is permitted); these votes each count both for the candidate and for the list they stand in. These votes counts are divided by the seats count to give fictional electors counts which can be summed up fairly throughout the canton.

Using the fictional electors counts, each party above the threshold (reaching 5% in at least one constituency) is apportioned seats canton-wide, which are then shared among their constituency lists. In each constituency list, the seats are attributed to the candidates reaching the most votes.

Candidates

Executive Council 
Five of the seven incumbents councilors ran for re-election: Mario Fehr (SP), Thomas Heiniger (FDP), Ernst Stocker (SVP), Markus Kägi (SVP), and Martin Graf (Grüne). The first four were seen as safe seats.

Incumbent councilors Ursula Gut (FDP) and Regine Aeppli (SP) stood down, with cantonal councilor Carmen Walker Späh (FDP) and national councilor Jacqueline Fehr (SP) running to replace them. Former councilor Hans Hollenstein (CVP) defeated narrowly in 2011 did not run, with the CVP running cantonal councilor Sylvia Steiner in his place.

The bourgeois parties (SVP, FDP, and CVP) ran as the "top-5" ticket, with the goals of unseating Martin Graf and gaining a fifth councilor for the alliance. The pre-election polls showed a tight race between Steiner and Graf for the last seat.

Three candidates from minor parties ran: Markus Bischoff for the Alternative List, Nik Gugger for the EVP, and Marcel Lenggenhager for the BDP.

Cantonal Council 
The table below lists contesting parties represented in the Cantonal Council before the election.

The Pirate Party ran again, along with Integrale Politik ZH and the Young Socialists, while the Swiss Democrats did not run, meaning a total of 13 parties contested this election, as many as in 2011.

Results

Executive Council 
Note: percentages here are calculated based on the amount of valid votes (excluding blank and invalid votes) so that the absolute majority is at exactly 50%, but may result in candidates reaching over 100% of the valid votes.

This election was an upset in the opposite direction than 2011. CVP candidate Sylvia Steiner regained the CVP's seat while overtaking both Carmen Walker Späh and Jacqueline Fehr, who were expected to perform better. Green candidate Martin Graf lost his seat by a margin of six thousand votes behind Jacqueline Fehr.

Thomas Heiniger topped the polls with over 82%, overtaking Mario Fehr for first place. The four regular incumbents (Heiniger, M. Fehr, Stocker, and Kägi) were re-elected comfortably while the race was closer between the other candidates. Both SVP candidates saw their vote share slightly increase.

The "top-5" ticket of bourgeois parties won in an upset, with five of the top six candidates, and flipping a fifth seat in the council.

Results by district

Cantonal Council 

The SVP retained its plurality of votes and seats in the council, and the social democrats maintained second place by gaining one seat. The liberals made the largest gains by far, gaining 8 seats, in what the Tages-Anzeiger described as a "triumphant comeback" after "decades of decline". Both ecologist parties lost over a quarter of their seats, while the Alternative List gained two seats. The Liberals' gains allowed the "top-5" alliance of bourgeois parties (SVP, FDP, and CVP) to re-gain a majority, while giving them a larger influence within the alliance.

Results by constituency

References 

Cantonal elections in Zürich
2015 elections in Switzerland